The braille alphabet used for the Tatar language is based on Russian Braille, with several additional letters found in the print Tatar alphabet.

Alphabet 
Tatar uses all of the letters of the Russian alphabet, though some just in loans, and has the additional letters ә, җ, ң, һ, ө, ү.

Punctuation

Single punctuation:

Paired punctuation:

Tatar Braille is reported to use the Russian arithmetical parentheses  ... .

Formatting

References

 UNESCO (2013) World Braille Usage, 3rd edition.

French-ordered braille alphabets
Tatar language